Northover is a former village, now a suburb of Glastonbury in Mendip, Somerset, England.

It should not be confused with Northover, Ilchester, a former parish and now an area of that town.

References

Glastonbury
Hamlets in Somerset